The Australian Housing and Urban Research Institute (AHURI) is a national not-for-profit independent network organization that funds, conducts, disseminates, and tailors research on housing, homelessness, cities and urban policy. The organisation's funding is received from the Australian Government, state and territory governments, as well as contributions from partner universities. As the only organisation in Australia dedicated exclusively to housing, homelessness, cities and related urban research, AHURI is a unique venture. Through its national network of university partners, AHURI undertakes research that supports policy development at all levels of government, assists industry in improving practice and informs the broader community. In 2022, AHURI had nine research partners across Australia.

Reports
Through its National Housing Research Program (NHRP), AHURI publishes around 25 policy research reports each year. 

The developing National Cities Research Program produces several reports each year, and AHURI also publishes a range of commissioned reports for clients including governments, community sector organisations, and industry.

All NHRP and NCRP reports are freely available, and published along with plain language summaries, policy implication summaries and diverse dissemination and engagement outputs.

Governance 
The AHURI Board consists of 10 directors: four independent directors, one of whom serves as the independent Chair. One director is appointed from the Australian Government, two from state and territory governments, and two from participating universities. The Managing Director is an ex officio appointment to the Board.

Government Partners 

The National Housing Research Program is funded through multi-lateral agreements involving the Australian Government and all state and territory governments. The NHRP funding agreements are typically 3 year agreements, and have been renewed continuously since 1999 in recognition of the impact of AHURI's work. 

Responsibility for housing policy sits with different departments in each jurisdiction (and name changes as well as structural changes to the machinery of government are not uncommon). In July 2022, the government departments associated with the NHRP funding agreement were:

 The Treasury (Australia) (with responsibility shared with the Department of Social Services (Australia)) 
 Department of Communities and Justice (New South Wales)
 Department of Families, Fairness and Housing (Victoria)
 Department of Communities, Housing and Digital Economy (Queensland)
 Department of Communities (Western Australia)
 South Australian Housing Authority
 Department of Communities (Tasmania)
 Housing ACT (Australian Capital Territory)
 Department of Territory Families, Housing and Communities (Northern Territory)

University Partners 
AHURI has nine university partners, which are (with director/leader):

 University of Sydney (Laurence Troy) 
 University of New South Wales (Hazel Easthope)
 University of South Australia (Braam Lowies)
 University of Adelaide (Emma Baker)
 University of Tasmania (Catherine Robinson)
 Monash University (Joshua Newman)
 Swinburne University of Technology (Andi Nygaard)
 RMIT University (Jago Dodson)
 Curtin University (Steven Rowley)

Activities 
AHURI's main activities are:

 National Housing Research Program - an annual, nationally competitive program funded by the Australian and all state/territory governments and managed by AHURI
 National Cities Research Program - a developing program of research focusing on cities and urban policy
 National Conference and Events Program - including the National Housing Conference, the National Homelessness Conference, one-day events, seminars, and webinars
 Professional Services - commissioned research and policy development 
AHURI also provides in-depth analysis of current policy and practice issues, drawing on their research library critical to ensure the evidence base is accessible. With a research library comprising around 400 final reports from the NHRP and a range of other reports and materials, the Institute's analysis presents key findings, case studies, data and policy implications through our news channels, and online analyses and briefs.

AHURI provides access to their catalogue of submissions made to key public government-led inquiries which provide an overview of the application of the AHURI evidence-base, as well as links to major media coverage of AHURI research, or senior AHURI staff’s evidence-informed commentary.

Policy Development Research Model 

AHURI has worked to increase its policy impact by transitioning from funding policy relevant research to a policy development research model (PDRM). The PDRM model has been developed and implemented by AHURI over more than a decade in its role as an intermediary between the research and policy communities. The PDRM integrates the traditionally separate processes of evidence building and policy development into one set of practices.

AHURI has experimented with the traditional research project model to incorporate ways of building engagement into the conduct of research. The development of new ‘research vehicles’ that formalize processes of engagement throughout the research process have represented significant steps in the development of the PDRM. These have been created through innovative developments in research approaches, extensive collaboration in the AHURI research network, and the leadership of senior researchers. Two successful research vehicles (of several that have been trialled) have been the Investigative Panel and the AHURI Inquiry. 

The Investigative Panel was first introduced by AHURI in 2010. Researchers conduct Investigative Panels to bring together the available evidence and a range of experts to interrogate a specific policy or practice issue. The Investigative Panel draws together elements of key informant interview and focus group approaches to generate new knowledge through the expert discussions. Investigative Panels may be supported by other research activities or methods such as a literature review, synthesis, interviews or secondary data analysis, but the information from the panel members is an important contribution to the research. Investigative Panels have been used to address rapidly emerging policy concerns, with over thirty Investigative Panels held to date. Investigative Panels have been particularly effective in bringing practitioners and industry representatives into the research process.

The AHURI Inquiry has become the flagship of the PDRM. AHURI Inquiries are substantial programs of research involving a suite of integrated research modules addressing substantial policy challenges. They are based on a commitment to multi-disciplinary and multi-method approaches to research. AHURI Inquiries have been designed to facilitate greater collaboration between the research, policy, and practitioner communities throughout the conduct of research. Inquiry evidence is generated from each of the modules, leveraging a range of research approaches to address complex problems. Because the overarching Inquiry sets the conceptual framework for understanding the policy issue, it is possible for evidence across discrete modules to be integrated and harnessed to address the policy problem. Each AHURI Inquiry is engaged with an Inquiry panel - drawing on a mix of policy and practice expertise from government, non-government and private sectors to consider the evidence and the outcomes of the research. The discussion of research evidence at Inquiry panel meetings, and the sharing of expertise and perspectives between researchers, policymakers, and practitioners informs policy development and practice innovation, and is captured in the final reports of the Inquiry. 

AHURI also fund research projects - using a wide range of transitional social and economic research methods.

Research Agendas 

Each year AHURI releases the NHRP Research Agenda. The Research Agenda is developed through consultation with senior government officials in the Australian Government, relevant state and territory government departments, as well as Research Centre Directors, and other key stakeholders. The NHRP Research Agenda is updated annually to provide direction in the development of this evidence-base and to set research topic priorities for the annual funding round.

The NCRP issues periodic competitive research briefs on emerging urban policy concerns.

Current Research 

At July 2022, current research included:

 Building and retaining an effective homelessness sector workforce
 Business models, consumer experiences and regulation of retirement villages
 Changes in supply/demand for affordable housing in the private rental sector, 2016–2021
 Crisis accommodation in Australia: now and for the future
 Drivers and outcomes of public housing relocation
 From mixed tenure development to mixed tenure neighbourhoods
 Gendered housing opportunities, pathways, assistance and impacts
 Homelessness policy and systems for people with disabilities
 How many in a crowd? Assessing overcrowding measures in Australian housing
 Improving Australian climate change adaption strategies: learning from international experience
 Indigenous mobility and its impact on remote infrastructural needs
 Innovations in stock matching and allocations for social housing
 Innovative home ownership models in Australia
 Measuring housing affordability: scoping the real costs of housing
 Measuring neighbourhood change through residential mobility and employment
 Modelling a filtering process in expanding affordable rental supply
 Modelling landlord behaviour and its impact on rental affordability: insights across two decades
 Predicting risk to inform housing policy and practice
 Private sector involvement in social and affordable housing supply
 Regulation of residential tenancies and impacts on investment
 Specialist Disability Accommodation in the social housing sector: policy and practice
 The impact of the pandemic on the Australian rental sector
 The new normal: COVID-19 and changed patterns of dwelling demand and supply
 Towards an Australian Housing and Homelessness Strategy
 Understanding how policy settings affect developers’ decisions
 Understanding poverty in Australian housing
 Urban Indigenous homelessness: much more than housing
 Voicing First Nations Country, community, and culture in urban policy

 Inquiry into financing first home ownership: opportunities and challenges
 Inquiry into housing in a circular economy
 Inquiry into housing policies and practices for precariously housed older Australians
 Inquiry into population growth in Australia’s smaller cities
 Inquiry into enhancing the coordination of housing supports for individuals leaving institutional settings

Conferences 

 The National Housing Conference (NHC) is a three-day biennial event. The most recent NHC was held in Melbourne in 2022 (delayed due to COVID-19), the next NHC will be in Brisbane in 2023
 The National Homelessness Conference is a three day biennial event. The 2020 National Homelessness Conference was a held as a virtual event due to COVID-19. The next conference will be held in Canberra in 2022
 Since early 2020, AHURI has conducted free research webinars as a means of disseminating research in the context of the pandemic. To date, over 30 webinars have been held

History

AHURI Mark 1 
AHURI was founded in 1993 as an initiative by the then Deputy Prime Minister Brian Howe to conduct and coordinate research on housing and urban affairs. The brief for a research consortium was won by RMIT (Mike Berry and Tony Dalton), Monash University (Chris Maher ), QUT (Bob Stimson) and CSIRO (Joe Flood). The research was carried out in-house. 

The initial consortium was found to be unwieldy, with the necessity to go to every State and partner university to sign on decisions.

AHURI Mark 2 
In 1999 a company structure was also adopted for AHURI, funded through a multilateral agreement between the Australian Government and state and territory governments, and universities able to become members of the Institute through an application process. CSIRO left the consortium, while the University of New South Wales, Swinburne University, Curtin University, and the University of Tasmania joined. Owen Donald became Executive Director. Ian Winter, a principal research fellow at the Institute of Family Studies was appointed as Research Director. When Donald was appointed as Victorian Director of Housing at the end of 2003, Winter took over as Executive Director and held the position until 2017, when Michael Fotheringham was appointed Managing Director.

As a unique partnership between the Australian Government and state and territory governments, and an Australia-wide network of university partners, AHURI has delivered vital research and insights that have guided governments and shaped community thinking. It has built a vast and informative evidence-base and advanced knowledge of housing, homelessness and urban issues. In 2019, to celebrate two decades of research, policy engagement, public events and research capacity building, AHURI produced the ’20 Years of AHURI’ commemorative publication.

Impact 
AHURI bases its reputation on being a knowledge broker and an advisor, and its role is facilitative. 

To articulate the impact of AHURI’s work on policy and practice, the Institute began publishing annual Policy Impact Statements in 2015-16. AHURI produces an annual Policy Impact Statement at the end of each financial year, in addition to an Annual Financial Report. The Policy Impact Statement provides a concise summary of the achievements and activities of the organisation across our research, policy and engagement activities. 

This annual document provides a snapshot of the outcomes of AHURI activities described each year, drawing on metrics such as engagement with AHURI in developing housing strategies, citations of AHURI research in policy documents, report downloads, conference attendance and media mentions to demonstrate impact. 

Policy Impact Statements also include case studies of policy development work undertaken by AHURI in partnership with governments. As such they are not rigidly tied to reporting on key performance indicators, but summarize the diverse activities undertaken each year.

In line with the increasing trends toward the assessment of research impact in universities, AHURI began provides individual annual policy impact statements for each university, capturing the policy impact of each university’s contributions in the context of AHURI’s overall policy impact.

AHURI’s policy impact is often a process that builds over several years, so capturing longer-range policy impact is an area of ongoing development at AHURI, including 
development of policy impact narratives

References

External links
Australian Housing and Urban Research Institute

Public policy research
Research institutes in Australia
Urban development in Australia